David Nutting may refer to:
 Dave Nutting, American video game designer
 David Nutting (RAF), British intelligence officer during the Second World War